Groaty pudding (also known as groaty dick) is a traditional dish from the Black Country in England. In the Black Country it is traditional to eat groaty pudding on Guy Fawkes Night.

It is mentioned as a local staple by Samuel Jackson Pratt in 1805.

See also

Haggis
Meatloaf
Nut roast
Red pudding
Scrapple
White pudding

References

British puddings
English beef dishes
Holiday foods
Victorian cuisine
Black Country
Savory puddings
Meat and grain sausages